Robidoux Branch is a stream in Washington County, Missouri. It is a tributary of Old Mines Creek.

Source coordinates are:  and the coordinates of the confluence are: .

Robidoux Branch, historically spelled "Roubidoux Branch", has the name of a pioneer citizen.

See also
List of rivers of Missouri

References

Rivers of Washington County, Missouri
Rivers of Missouri